An SD9 is a 6-axle diesel locomotive built by General Motors Electro-Motive Division between January 1954 and June 1959. An EMD 567C 16-cylinder engine generated . Externally similar to its predecessor, the SD7, the SD9 was built with the improved and much more maintainable 567C engine.

Four hundred and seventy-one SD9s were built for American railroads, while a further 44 were produced for export.

Many SD9s both high and short-hood can still be found in service today on shortline railroads and industrial operators. Although most Class 1 roads stopped using these locomotives by the 1970s and 1980s, some remain in rebuilt form on some major Class I railroads, as switcher locomotives.

History 
The SD9 was the second model of EMD's SD (special duty) line of locomotives, following the SD7. Just as the SD7 was a lengthened GP7 with two additional axles, the SD9 was a corresponding modification of the GP9. The additional axles in SD series locomotives provide more tractive effort and more even distribution of locomotive weight compared to the four axle GP series locomotives.

SD9s can be distinguished from the similar looking SD7s by observing the position of the classification lights on the ends of the locomotive, above the number board. The SD9's classification lights are on a small pod, canted outward, while the SD7's classification lights are closer to the centerline and flush with the hood. 

The last phase of construction had a carbody similar to the SD18 and SD24, and used two  cooling fans instead of four  cooling fans.

EMD ended SD9 production in June 1959. It was succeeded by the SD18 which began production in 1960.

Variants 
EMD produced a lightweight variant of the SD9, named the SD9s. This locomotive had its weight reduced for service on lighter tracks with modifications such as a smaller fuel tank.

Original buyers

Preservation 

Some SD9 locomotives can be found in museums and on tourist lines, and at least two are in service on a working railroad:

Dakota Southern Railway used SD9 #506 and SD9E #4427 in revenue freight service.
BNSF 6125 was donated to the Inland Northwest Rail Museum at Reardan, WA in 2020. This unit was originally built for the Great Northern Railway as GN 598 and was incorporated in the formation of the Burlington Northern Railroad in 1970. It became part of BNSF after the merger of the Burlington Northern and Santa Fe Railroads in 1995. The same museum would later acquire former GN 599 from the City of Skykomish in early 2023 and will be cosmetically restored with its mechanical parts used for 598's restoration. 
The Columbia Basin Railroad In Eastern Washington State owns 5 ex-BNSF and Montana Rail Link SD9s that are actively used in both road and switching service. 
Colorado & Southern 839, later Burlington Northern 6234, was donated by successor Burlington Northern Santa Fe Corp. to the Minnesota Transportation Museum.  It now operates on the museum's Osceola and St Croix Valley Railway.  6234 is an example of the last variation of SD9 locomotives produced, which used the SD18 carbody.
The Nevada Northern Railway uses #204, ex-SP SD9E #4426 to occasionally to pull their passenger trains.
Southern Pacific 4404 is preserved at WRIX/Western Rail INC. 
Milwaukee Road 532, rebuilt by the Milwaukee into an 'SD10', lives at the Whitewater Valley Railroad.  It was originally their 2235.
Nickel Plate Road 349 is preserved at the Mad River & Nickel Plate Railroad Museum. It was retired as Norfolk Southern #52, and was donated to the museum in December 2010. It has been restored to its Norfolk & Western appearance.
Nickel Plate Road 358 is preserved at the Fort Wayne Railroad Historical Society. Undergoing full restoration into NKP appearance.
The Portland and Western Railroad uses two SD9s for switching and industry service. PNWR 1852 operates out of their Albany, OR Burlington Northern yard and PNWR 1854 is assigned to the rock train, both Ex-SP Heritage.
The Oregon Coast Scenic Railroad has an ex-POTB SD9 #6139 in operating condition and is used as a backup locomomotive.
The Western Rail Inc. owns 3 SD9m (SD9 rebuild) units. 13, 50, & 1886. 13 & 50 are Ex-Norfolk Southern, Exx-Norfolk & Western, née Nickel Plate Road. 1886 is Ex-Norfolk Southern, Exx-Southern, née Central of Georgia.
BNSF still rosters several SD9's. 4 are known to have been rebuilt into SD9-3's, numbers 1550-1553, and have modern EMD cabs. One has been sold and is being transported to a museum in Spokane, Washington. #1550 has been donated to the Lake Superior Railroad Museum.
An ex-Central of Georgia SD9, Black River & Western Railroad 9581, is currently on lease to Kinder-Morgan Newport News for yard duty.
The Albany & Eastern Railroad (AERC) has 1 SD9E in Black Widow paint, AERC/LLW 5399, It is used for both Passenger and Freight service in Lebanon, OR.
Both engines worked for construction of KTX Gyeongbu section as departmental vehicles upon retirement of KORAIL.
The Niles Canyon Railway owns one Ex-Southern Pacific SD9 #5472. It was built in 1956 and had a restoration to operational condition in 2005.

References

 
 Sarberenyi, Robert. EMD SD9 Original Owners. Retrieved on August 27, 2006
 Komanesky, John.  Preserved EMD Locomotives. Retrieved on May 18, 2009

External links

SD09
C-C locomotives
Diesel-electric locomotives of the United States
Railway locomotives introduced in 1954
Freight locomotives
Standard gauge locomotives of the United States
Standard gauge locomotives of South Korea